Carney Creek or Carneys Branch is a stream in eastern Barry County in the Ozarks of southwest Missouri.

The stream source is just southwest of Wheelerville on Missouri Route 248. It flows to the south-southeast and receives waters from Gum and Carney springs before joining Flat Creek. The stream's flow is intermittent and the confluence is about five and a half miles from its source.

Carney Creek was named after Thomas Carney, a pioneer settler.

See also
List of rivers of Missouri

References

Rivers of Barry County, Missouri
Rivers of Missouri